Eagleton is a rural residential suburb in the Hunter Region of New South Wales, Australia. It is within the Port Stephens local government area.

Demographic
In the 2016 census, Eagleton had 211 permanent residents with a median age of 49. 50.5% of the population were male, and 49.5% were female. Australian, English, Irish, Scottish, and German were the most represented cultures.

Eagleton Creamery 
The Eagleton Creamery was established in September 1892. It officially opened  as Eagleton Co-operative Creamery Co in October 1892.  It did daily deliveries of cream to Ireland's Creamery and Refrigerating Works at Newcastle to make into butter. On 1 July 1897 the company decided go into voluntary liquidation and cease operation

References

1892 establishments in Australia
Suburbs of Port Stephens Council